Family 1, also known as the Lake Group, is the name given to a group of Greek New Testament minuscule manuscripts of the Gospels, identified by biblical scholar Kirsopp Lake. These manuscripts vary in date from the 12th to the 15th century. The group takes its name from minuscule codex 1, now in the Basel University Library, Switzerland. "Family 1" is also symbolized as ƒ in critical editions of the Greek New Testament. Textual-critic Hermann von Soden refers to the group as I. Though initially named after minuscule 1, later studies have demonstrated that another minuscule, minuscule 1582, is likely a better candidate as a representation of the archetype from which the Family 1 manuscripts are descended.

All ƒ manuscripts place the Pericope adulterae (John 7:53-8:11) after John 21:25 (the final verse of the book) as a separate story, and not included as a part of the Gospel as it is in the majority of manuscripts.

History 
Family 1 was discovered in 1902, when Lake published Codex 1 of the Gospels and its Allies, and established the existence of a new textual family. This group of manuscripts was initially based on the following four minuscules:
 Minuscule 1
 Minuscule 118
 Minuscule 131
 Minuscule 209
The group was then joined by the minuscules 22 and 1582. The minuscules 205, 872, 1278, 2193, and 2886 (formerly labelled 205) are now considered to be members of the family also.

The most obvious characteristic of the Lake Group is that these manuscripts place Pericope adulterae (John 7:53-8:11) after John 21:25. Manuscripts of this family include the Longer ending of Mark to the text, but minuscules 1, 209, 1582, 2193 and 2886 contain an explanatory comment (known as a scholion) that brings into question the authenticity of Mark 16:9-20: 
. 
(In some of the copies the evangelist finishes at this point, at which point also Eusebius Pamphili finished his canons. But these [verses] are also found in many (others).)

A similar scholion appears in the minuscules 22, 1192, and 1210:
. 
(In some of the copies the evangelist finishes at this point. But these [verses] are also found in many (others).)

Biblical scholar Burnett Hillman Streeter, working largely on the basis of data supplied by Lake, proposed that ƒ, along with Codex Koridethi (Θ), Family 13 (ƒ), the minuscules 28, 565, 700, the Armenian and Georgian versions, and later on also Codex Washingtonianus (W), were the remnants of what he labelled the Caesarean Text, differing in a number of common respects from the then established Byzantine, Western and Alexandrian text-types. (The text-types are groups of different New Testament manuscripts which share specific or generally related readings, which then differ from each other group, and thus the conflicting readings can separate out the groups. These are then used to determine the original text as published; the three main types are as above.) Scholars disagree as to whether this is a correct classification, or if a "Caesarean text-type" even exists, it is however demonstratable that ƒ is not able to be placed within the Alexandrian, Western, or Byzantine text-types.

Biblical scholar Silva Lake (wife of Kirsopp Lake), discovered that Minuscule 652 represents the text of ƒ in Mark 4:20-6:24, though this agreement was mainly with minuscules 118, 131, and 209, as opposed to a similar agreement with minuscule 1.

Biblical scholar Amy Anderson made a new reconstruction of the family tree in 2004, demonstrating minuscule 1582 was a more exact representation of the text of the archetype than minuscule 1. She identified the Family 1 manuscripts in Matthew as the minuscules 1, 22, 118, 131, 205, 209, 872, 1192, 1210, 1278, 1582, 2193 and 2542.

Alison Sarah Welsby, in her 2012 doctoral thesis, identified the ƒ manuscripts in John as the minuscules 1, 22, 118, 131, 205 (2886), 205, 209, 565, 872, 884, 1192, 1210, 1278, 1582, 2193, 2372, and 2713, also coinciding with Anderson's view that 1582 was a better ƒ witness than 1. The work of Bruce Morrill on John 18 also confirmed 138, 357, 994, 2517 and 2575 as core members of ƒ in John's Gospel.

Within the family, there are three manuscripts which may be more closely related. 209 was part of Catholic humanist and theologian Cardinal Bessarion's collection by 1438 A.D., and may have served as the exemplar for minuscule 2886, which was copied at his direction before 1468 CE, and even minuscule 205, which was copied at his direction after 1468 CE.

Minuscule 2886, before receiving its own Gregory-Aland number (an official list of known New Testament manuscripts), was long assumed to be a direct copy of 205 and was thus named 205 (from Abschrift, the German word for copy). Biblical scholar D. C. Parker rehearsed Lake's views who thought 209 to have been the parent of 205, and then Parker rehearses Josef Schmid's views who considered 2886 and 205 to be daughters of 209's lost sister.

Textual-critic Kurt Aland lists the group under Category III in the Gospels and Category V for the other books in his New Testament manuscripts list.  Category III manuscripts are described as having "a small but not a negligible proportion of early readings, with a considerable encroachment of [Byzantine] readings, and significant readings from other sources as yet unidentified." Category V is for "Manuscripts with a purely or predominantly Byzantine text."

Claremont group profile 

According to the Wisse, the group profiles of the Lake's Family in Luke 1, 10, and 20 are:
 Luke 1: 9, 11, 17, 20, (22), 23, 24, 25, 26, 28, 29, 32, (34), 36, 37, 40, 43, (47), 48, 50, 51, 53.
 Luke 10: 2, 5, 6, 7, 11, 13, 15, 20, 22, (23), 27, (29), 34, 37, 40, 44, 45, 46, 49, 50, 51, 52, 54, 55, 56, 58, 59, 62.
 Luke 20: 1, 5, 6, (7), 10, 11, 14, 19, 20, 25, 27, 28, 29, 31, 33, 41, 44, 45, 48, 51, 56, 58, 59, 60, 61, 62, 63, 64, 66, 67, 68, 69, 72, 75, 76.

Relationship to the Textus Receptus 
A comparison of the texts of the four main Lake manuscripts (1, 118, 131, and 209) with the text of the Textus Receptus, shows there are 2243 variants in ƒ from the Textus Receptus in the sections comprising Matthew 1-10, Matthew 22-Mark 14, Luke 4-23, John 1-13, and John 18; 1731 of these are found in codices 118 and 209, and 209 has 214 more variants not found in 118. Similarly there are 1188 variants in ƒ from the Textus Receptus for the sections comprising Mark 1-5 and Luke 1-24, of which 804 are found in 131, which elsewhere agrees very closely with the Textus Receptus. Lake did not enumerate itacistic differences.

Notable family readings 

Matthew 1:11
  (Ioakim, and Ioakim begot) — ƒ M U Θ Σ 33 258 478 661 954 1216 1230 1354 1604 ℓ 54 syr.

Matthew 2:18
  — 1-22-1582  B Z 0250 372 ℓ 2211 it syr eth
  — 131-205-209-872-1192-1210-1278-2193 C D L W ƒ 33 700 892.

Matthew 5:44
  (bless those who curse you, do good to those who hate you)
 omit - ƒ  B k syr sa bo.
 incl. - Majority of manuscripts

Matthew 6:5
  — 1-22-118-205-209-1278*-1582  B Z 372 660 892
  — 131-1192-1210-2193 1278 D L W Δ Θ ƒ 28 33 565 579 700 1424.

Matthew 6:12
  — 1-22-1582 * B Z 660 1365
  — 118-131-205-209-1192-1210-1278-2193
 / — D L W Δ Θ 157 565

Matthew 6:18
  (twice) — 1-22-1582
  — 118-131-205-209 1192 1210 1278 2193

Matthew 8:13
  — 1-22-118-205-209-1210*-1582  B 0250 0281 33
  — 131 872 1192 1210 2193 C L W Δ Θ ƒ 157 565 579 700 1424

Matthew 8:13
  (and when the centurion returned to the house in that hour, he found the slave well)
 incl. - ƒ  C (N) Θ (0250) (33 1241) g syr
 omit - Majority.

Matthew 10:12
  (saying, 'Peace to this house) - ƒ * D L W Θ 1010 (1424) it vg.
  (it.) - Majority

Matthew 19:16
  (teacher) — ƒ  B D L 892 1010 1365 ℓ 5 it bo eth geo; Origen, Hilary
  (good teacher) — C K W Δ Θ ƒ 28 33 565 700 892 1009 1071 1079 1195 1216 1230 1241 1242 1253 1344 1546 1646 2148 2174 Byz Lect it vg syr sa arm eth Diatessaron.

Matthew 20:23
  (and be baptized with the baptism that I am baptized with)
 omit — ƒ  B D L Z Θ 085 ƒ it syr cop
 incl. - Majority of manuscripts

Matthew 25:41
 ο  (which my Father prepared for the devil) — ƒ D
  (prepared for the devil) - Majority of manuscripts

Matthew 27:35
  (my clothes for themselves, and for my cloak they threw lots)
 incl. — ƒ Δ Θ 0250 ƒ 537 1424
 omit - Majority of manuscripts

  (so that it was already beginning to sink) — ƒ  (so that the boat was already being filled up) — Majority of manuscripts

  (prepared by My Father) — ƒ * (Θ ) 1071 1241 (ℓ 60 ) it it Diatessaron
  (prepared) — Majority of manuscripts

  (Bethsphage) — ƒ B Γ 1241
  (Bethphage) — Majority of manuscripts

  (Blessed be the kingdom of our father, David! Hosanna in the highest; peace in heaven and glory on high!) — 1-131-209 Θ
 η  (the coming kingdom in the name of Yahweh! Blessed be the kingdom of our father, David! Hosanna in the highest!) — 118Luke 11:4
  (but deliver us from evil) 
 omit - ƒ  B L 700 vg syr sa bo arm geo
 incl. -  Majority of manuscripts

  (the mountain of Olives) - 1-131-209''' X* Γ e
  (the mountain called Olivet) - Majority of manuscripts
  (the mountain called 'Of Olives) - X

 omit - ƒ' X 565 1009 1365 ℓ 76 ℓ 253 b vg syr arm geo Diatessaron
 incl. - Majority of manuscripts

 See also 

 Family 13
 Caesarean text-type
 Categories of New Testament manuscripts

 References 

 Bibliography 

 B. H. Streeter, The four Gospels a Study of Origins Treating the Manuscript Tradition, Sources, Authorship, & Dates, Oxford 1924, pp. 77–107.

 External links 
 Family 1 at the Encyclopedia of Textual Criticism''

Greek New Testament manuscripts